The Temple Building is the name of a high-rise building located in Rochester, New York, United States. In the early 1920's, Reverend Clinton Wunder, Pastor of the Second Baptist Church of Rochester, NY, convinced his congregation to build the Temple Building. The parish had outgrown their existing church. Wunder thought that a nine-story building would become an economic engine for the Church's mission. Eventually the plans changed to a fourteen-story building. Many in the congregation thought that it was unwise to build a fourteen-story "Skyscraper Church."

Wunder prevailed and a building committee, headed by William Hartman, was established. Originally the committee decided to build a hotel with the new church. They changed direction and decided an office building instead of a hotel would be better suited for the needs of the church and also more profitable. Hartman died suddenly in July 1923, but not before every penny of the estimated $1,900,000 needed for construction had been raised to build the Temple Building. The existing church was quickly demolished, and construction began in 1924. Until the Temple Building was complete, the congregation would temporarily worship in the old Lyceum Theater. Arthur Castle, the new chairman of the building committee was determined to finish construction within one year, and very nearly succeeded. Despite many trying circumstances, the new Temple Building was dedicated on September 7, 1925.

During the early years of its use, the building’s auditorium was frequently filled to capacity, and it was not uncommon to turn folks away.  Wunder had strong oratorical skills and unusual advertising and promotional abilities to promote the Temple Building. Each year more than 100,000 people would walk through the Temple doors to attend worship services or an occasional debate.  In 1926, Wunder invited Clarence Darrow to Rochester for a debate at the Temple Building with him on the topic "Has Life A Purpose?" Darrow's argument was based on his bold agnostic theories. The Church prospered and the Temple Building became one of Rochester's most famous landmark destinations.

See also
List of tallest buildings in Rochester, New York

References

External links

Skyscraper office buildings in Rochester, New York
Residential skyscrapers in Rochester, New York
Commercial buildings completed in 1925
1925 establishments in New York (state)